Dysart Airport  is an airport near Dysart, Queensland with one  runway.

Dysart Airport is privately owned by the BHP Mitsubishi Alliance (BMA). On 17 May 2013, BMA closed the airport to all but Royal Flying Doctor Service and Medivac flights, at the time promising to reveal a reopening strategy to Dysart Aero Club members.

As of February 2016, the airport remains closed to all but medical flights. In the latest edition of the ERSA, BMA has deregistered the airport.

References

External links 
 Dysart Airport

Airports in Queensland
Buildings and structures in Central Queensland
Isaac Region
Privately owned airports